Love Can Seriously Damage Your Health is a 1997 Spanish comedy film directed by Manuel Gómez Pereira and starring Ana Belén, Juanjo Puigcorbé, Gabino Diego and Penélope Cruz.

Synopsis 
Paris. King Juan Carlos I offers a diner at Hôtel Crillon. Diana (Ana Belén) meets Santi (Juanjo Puigcorbé), an old lover, who now is the King's bodyguard. They remember how they met each other, 30 years ago, in another hotel, in Madrid. Diana (Penélope Cruz) and Santi (Gabino Diego) met when The Beatles were going to play. He works in the hotel. She hides under John Lennon's bed because she's in love with the singer. But, what starts is an attraction between them. It is an impossible love because she wants to be rich and famous, and he is poor and has to join the Air Force. When they meet again, Diana has become a socialite, and Santi is a pilot. Both are married, but the love goes on...

Cameo appearances
The film uses cameo appearances by real figures from vintage footage and other fields to great comic effect.  They include John Lennon, Carmen Polo, Raphael, King Juan Carlos I and his daughters. There are other cameos during the film: actors Javier Bardem, Aitana Sánchez-Gijón or film director Fernando Colomo have got small roles.

Production 
The film was produced by Sogetel and BocaBoca Producciones.

Reception
The film opened on 110 screens and grossed $982,575 for the week finishing second at the Spanish box office behind fellow opener Ransom.

See also 
 List of Spanish films of 1997

References

External links
 
 

1997 films
1990s Spanish-language films
1997 comedy films
Spanish comedy films
Films directed by Manuel Gómez Pereira
Films scored by Bernardo Bonezzi
BocaBoca Producciones films
1990s Spanish films